A.E.K (Athlitikí Énosis Konstantinoupόleos, Athletic Union of Constantinople), known as A.E.K, is a major Greek multi-sport club based in Nea Filadelfeia, Athens. The club is more commonly known in European competitions as A.E.K Athens.

Established in Athens in 1924 by Greek refugees from Constantinople after the 1919–22 Greco-Turkish war and the subsequent population exchange between Greece and Turkey, it is one of the three most successful clubs in Greece. While it fields teams in many sports under the umbrella of its amateur sports arm, Amateur AEK (Erasitechnikί AEK)
with A.E.K. Handball team to be the best Greek handball club in European achievements having obtained one EHF European Cup (in 2021) and having also reached to the finals (in 2018) and to the semi-finals (in 2019),
AEK sports club is best known for its professional football team which have made some notable wins on European competitions (participating at the Semi-final of Europa League in 1977), having also obtained 12 Greek Championships, 15 Greek Cups, 1 Greek League Cup, 3 Greek Super Cups) and also for the professional basketball team which has won the Greek Basket League eight times, the Greek Basket Cup five times, the FIBA Saporta Cup twice, once the FIBA Basketball Champions League and once the FIBA Intercontinental Cup.

History

1924–1945 

The large Greek population of Constantinople, not unlike those of the other Ottoman urban centres, continued its athletic traditions in the form of numerous athletic clubs. Clubs such as Énosis Tataoúlon and Iraklís (today Kurtuluş S.K.) from the Tatavla district, Mégas Aléxandros and Ermís of Galata, and Olympiás of Therapia existed to promote the Hellenic athletic and cultural ideals. These were amongst a dozen Greek-backed clubs that dominated the sporting landscape of the city in the years preceding World War I. After the war, with the influx of mainly French and British soldiers to Constantinople, many of the city clubs participated in regular competition with teams formed by the foreign troops. Taxim, Pera, and Tatavla became the scene of weekly competitions in football, athletics, cycling, boxing and tennis.

Ermís, one of the most popular clubs, was formed in 1875 by the Greek community of the city.

Another club of Pera (Galata), known as Pera, since the mid-1880s, forced to change its name to Pera Sports Club, and then Beyoğlu S.K., in 1923. Many of its athletes, with those of the other sporting clubs, fled during the population exchanges at the end of the Greco-Turkish War, and settled mainly in Athens and Thessaloniki.

In 1924, the founders of AEK - a group of Constantinopolitan refugees (among them many athletes from the Pera Sports Club and the other Constantinopolitan clubs) - met at the athletic shop "Lux" of Emilios Ionas and Konstantinos Dimopoulos on Veranzerou Street, in the center of Athens, and created AEK. Their intention was to create a club that provided athletic and cultural diversions for the thousands of predominantly Constantinopolitan and Anatolian refugees who had settled in the new suburbs of Athens (including Nea Filadelfeia, Nea Ionia, Nea Chalkidona, Nea Smyrni).

AEK's first president, Konstantinos Spanoudis (1871–1941), a journalist and associate of the Prime Minister Eleftherios Venizelos, petitioned the government to set aside land for the establishment of a sports ground. In 1926, land in Nea Filadelfeia that was originally set aside for refugee housing, was donated as a training ground for the refugees' sports activities. AEK began using the ground for training, albeit unofficially.
 
In 1930, the property where AEK trained was officially signed over to the club. Venizelos soon approved the plans to build what was to become AEK's home ground for the next 70 years, the Nikos Goumas Stadium. The liberal politician was present at the inauguration of the stadium.

AEK Athletic Club was established in 1924 and is one of the most successful departments of AEK. One of the first sections of the AEK athletic club was cycling. M. Kaloudis was a winner in the Balkan Games (in 1940 in Bucharest when he was third) and was one of the founders of the Chamber. He first appeared in 1929 and was followed by Petoun, Tarsinian and Krisalis. Another cycling ace was Kouvelis, who won the gold medal in the Balkan Games of 1940 in the race of 33 kilometers. Both Kaloudis and his Kouvelis participated in the Olympic Games in London in 1948.

1945–1960 

In the Olympic Games of 1948 in London, M. Kaloudis led to the new excursion of AEK in cycling. At the beginning of the 1950s, the sport had blossomed and AEK competed with Panionios and Panathinaikos. The department then had a plethora of skilled cyclists as Davouti, Kouyioumtzis (won the race Athens-Loutraki 1952), Chatziargyri, Georgiadis, Arapi, Barda, Alexis, Tzioti, Barla, Trasian, etc.

AEK Table Tennis Club acquired the third position, both in men and in young men championships, in Greece in 1959. AEK Athens Table Tennis (ping-pong) Club, participated in Greek championships during the decades of 1950s, 1960s, 1970s and 1980s.

1961–1970 
AEK was the first ever Greek basketball team to participate in the FIBA European Champions Cup (now called the EuroLeague) Final Four, in 1966, which was held in Bologna, Italy. Two years later, AEK was the first-ever Greek team, not only to reach a FIBA European Cup Winners' Cup Final, but also to win a European-wide title. On April 4, 1968, AEK captained by Giorgos Amerikanos, defeated Slavia VŠ Praha, by a score of 89–82, in Athens, in front of 80,000 spectators (at the time, the Guinness world record in basketball attendance) in Kallimarmaron Stadium.

AEK Athens V.C. is the volleyball team of the Greek sports club AEK. It was re-founded in 1967 by Jason Platsi. Over the years AEK have struggled to stay in the top flight of Greek volleyball, competing in A2 (Greece's second division) and A1.

The Boxing Club was founded in 1969 and during the 1970s had its first success.

1971–1980 

The football team, with star player the striker Thomas Mavros, reached the semi-finals of UEFA Cup in 1977, where they were eliminated by Juventus. The Italian team eventually won the trophy.

With many star players they continued appearing in European (UEFA Champions League and UEFA Cup) competitions.

1981–1990 

AEK Table Tennis Club acquired the third position in Greek Cups of 1984 and 1985. The relevant department of AEK was inactive for almost 23 years (1986–2009).

1991–2000 

The football team, under the guidance of ex-player Dušan Bajević won three consecutive championships in 1992, 1993 and 1994.

Since 1995, AEK also has a women's volley club team, which has advanced to the final of the Greek Cup (2011).

The department of fencing was founded in 1996.

The basketball team reached the FIBA EuroLeague's Final Four in Barcelona in 1998, and beat Benetton Treviso, by a score of 69–66, before losing in the EuroLeague Final to Kinder Bologna, by a score of 44–58. In 2000, on 11 April, AEK won their second international trophy, the FIBA Saporta Cup, by defeating Kinder Bologna 83–76.

The biggest success for the boxing department came in the late 1990s, with Tigran Ouzlian, Artur Mikaelyan and Mike Arnaoutis (who became a professional boxer in the United States).

2001–2010 

 

AEK H.C. is also another growing department of AEK. It was founded by a decision of the General Assembly of AEK on July 12, 2005. On August 5, 2005, the Greek Handball Federation accepted a merger of GA Ilioupolis with the Handball Sports Union of Constantinople. In 2007 AEK HC was 3rd in A1 and gained the first participation in European Cups. On 31 May 2009, AEK HC won the Greek Cup in Serres.

The department of AEK Futsal Club was established in 2008 by a merger with Enosi Geraka futsal team and participated in B'Ethniki (second division), where it finished first at the regular season and second after play-off games. However, for the period 2009–10 AEK futsal club is playing again at B'Ethniki, due to a decision taken by EPO (Greek Football Federation), forbidding all team mergers generally. AEK Futsal Club terminated at second position of B'Ethniki after play-off games in April 2010 and gained the participation in A'Ethniki (first division) for the period 2010–11 and has been advanced to the semi-finals of the Greek Cup (2011).

The Chess department was founded by a decision of the General Assembly of AEK on 12 July 2005. The department staffed directly by 3 September 2005 is a member of the Greek Chess Federation. In 2006 AEK Chess Club was Greek Cup finalist and in 2008 Greek Cup semi-finalist (third place). Also won the Attica Cup in 2006 and the Attica Rapid Championships in 2006, 2009 and 2010. In 2010 participated at A' Ethniki (1st Division) and took the seventh place.

AEK VC had its finest moment with coach Stelios Prosalikas, as has prevailed in the final four of the European Cup Winners Cup. The races held (9–10 March 2000) in the closed Nea Liosia and AEK lost in the semi-final by Cuneo, but won 3–1 Galatasaray in the small final and won the third place.

2011–2020 
In 2011, AEK FC won the Greek Cup.

In 2011, AEK HC won the Greek Championship.

Also, on 26 February 2011, AEK HC advanced to the quarter-final (best 8) of European Challenge Cup by defeating Sporting Lisboa.

In 2012, AEK WVC won the Greek Women Championship.

In 2013, AEK HC make Double won the Greek Championship and the Greek Cup.

In 2014, AEK HC won the Greek Cup.

In 2014, AEK VC won the Greek Men's League Cup.

In 2016, AEK FC won the Greek Cup.

In 2018, AEK BC won the FIBA Champions League and the Greek Cup.

In 2018, AEK FC won the Greek Championship.

In 2018, AEK Futsal won the Greek Cup.

Also, in 2018, AEK HC reached the final of Challenge Cup.

In 2019, AEK BC won the FIBA Intercontinental Cup.

In 2019, AEK Futsal won the Greek Championship.

In 2019, AEK Women's Futsal won the Hellenic Futsal Greek Championship.

In 2020, AEK BC won the Greek Cup.

In 2020 AEK Futsal won the Greek Championship.

In 2020, AEK HC won the Greek Championship.

In 2021, AEK HC won the Greek Championship, the Greek Cup and the EHF European Cup, a historic treble.

Crest and colours
Since the club's foundation AEK adopted the image of a double-headed eagle on a golden yellow background. The emblem and colours were chosen as a reminder for the lost homelands and they represent the club's historical ties to Constantinople. Its usage also survived as a decorative element in the Greek Orthodox Church, which was the inheritor of the Byzantine legacy during the Ottoman Empire, while it remained a popular symbol among Greeks. In modern Greece various variations of the two-headed eagles are used in Church flags (based on Byzantine flag patterns and heraldic emblems) and officially by the Hellenic Army; the bird found also its way into the Greek coat of arms for a brief period in 1925–1926.

Departments
AEK is an amateur multi-sports club with the mission to create and advance as many sports as it is possible and its main professional and semiprofessional teams operate independently.

The club has teams in many sports, including athletics, cycling, boxing, chess, fencing, table tennis, wrestling, weightlifting, gymnastics, swimming, water polo both male and female teams, rugby league, tennis, badminton, kickboxing, taekwondo, Brazilian jiu-jitsu, wheelchair basketball, and esports, but its most popular teams primarily compete in association football, basketball, volleyball, handball, and futsal.

Titles

A.E.K. Football Club (30)
Greek Championships (12):
 1939, 1940, 1963, 1968, 1971, 1978, 1979, 1989, 1992, 1993, 1994, 2018

Greek Cup (15):
 1932, 1939, 1949, 1950, 1956, 1964, 1966, 1978, 1983, 1996, 1997, 2000, 2002, 2011, 2016

Greek League Cup (1):
 1990 (record)

Greek Super Cup (2): 1989, 1996

A.E.K. Basketball Club (17)

 Intercontinental Cup (1):

 2019

European Cup Winners' Cup / Saporta Cup (2): 
 1968, 2000

Champions League (1): 
 2018

Greek Championships (8):
 1958, 1963, 1964, 1965, 1966, 1968, 1970, 2002

Greek Basketball Cup (5):
 1981, 2000, 2001, 2018, 2020

A.E.K. Handball Club (9) 
  EHF European Cup (1):
  2021

 Greek Championship (4):
  2011, 2013, 2020, 2021

  Greek Cup (4):
  2009, 2013, 2014, 2021

A.E.K. Volleyball Club Men (1)

Greek Men League Cup (1):

 2014

A.E.K. Volleyball Club Women (3) 
 Greek Women Championship (1):

 2012

Greek Women Cup (1):

 2023

Greek Women Super Cup (1):

 2012

A.E.K. Rugby League

 Greek Championship 9's (2): 2018, 2019
 Greek Championship 13's (2): 2018, 2019

A.E.K. Futsal Men (5)

 Greek Championship (2)

 2019, 2020

Greek Cup (1)

 2018

Greek Super Cup (2)

 2018, 2019

A.E.K. Futsal Women (3) 

Hellenic Futsal Super League Women (1)

 2019

Hellenic Futsal Greek Cup Women (1)

 2022

Hellenic Futsal Greek Super Cup Women (1)

 2022

A.E.K. Cycling

 Greek Championship, Overall Standings (10)

 1960, 1961, 1962, 1964, 1965, 1966, 1968, 1975, 1979, 1981

A.E.K. Boxing

 Greek Championship, Men (6)
 1978, 1980, 1995, 1999, 2000, 2006

A.E.K. Athletics

 Greek Cross-Country Championships (men) 10:
 1937, 1946, 1957, 1958, 1959, 1960, 1961, 1962, 1963, 1964

 Greek Championship, Women 4:
 2011, 2012, 2013, 2014

 Greek Indoor Championship, Women 3:
 2011, 2015, 2016

 Greek Cross-Country Championship, Women 3:
 2010, 2011, 2012

A.E.K. Fencing (12)

 Greek Championship, Women 10:
 2012, 2013, 2014, 2015, 2016, 2017, 2018, 2019, 2020, 2021

 Greek Championship, Men 2:
 2018, 2020

A.E.K. Table Tennis

 Greek Championship, Men (2):
 2019, 2020

A.E.K. Artistic Swimming

 Greek Championship OPEN (1):
 2022

A.E.K. Bowling

 Greek Championship (1):
 2022

A.E.K. eSports

 Greek eCup (1):
 2022
 Championship VGL Greece-Cyprus FIFA 11vs11 (1): Season 2 2019-20
 Championship Superliga GR FIFA 11vs11 VGL (1): 2021
 Championship Greek League HFP 11vs11 (1): Season 4 2022

European and Worldwide honours

Notable supporters 

 Giannis Aivazis, actor, handball player
 Alekos Alavanos, politician
 Antonis Antoniou, actor
 Milena Apostolaki, politician
 Evangelia Aravani, model
 Eleftheria Arvanitaki, singer
 Vasilis Avlonitis, actor
 Bartholomew I of Constantinople, is the 270th and current Archbishop of Constantinople and Ecumenical Patriarch
 Maria Bakodimou, TV presenter
 Niki Bakoyianni, high jumper
 Sotiria Bellou, rebetiko singer
 Nikos Beloyannis, resistance leader
 Kostas Bigalis, singer
 Max Cavalera, musician
 Christodoulos of Athens, Archbishop of Athens and All Greece
 Nives Celsius, model
 Rallia Christidou, singer, politician
 Phoebus Delivorias, singer, songwriter
 Lavrentis Dianellos, actor
 Nikos Dimou, writer
 Natalia Dragoumi, actress
 Antigoni Drisbioti, race walker
 Yannis Economides, filmmaker
 Chronis Exarhakos, actor
 Tasos Giannopoulos, actor
 Manolis Glezos, politician
 Kostas Hatzichristos, actor
 Nasos Iliopoulos,  SYRIZA's Press representative
 Antonis Kafetzopoulos, actor 
 Antonis Kalogiannis, singer
 Manos Katrakis, actor
 Michalis Kaltezas, victim of police's abuse of authority
 Stelios Kazantzidis, singer
 Panos Kammenos, politician
 Tzortzia Kefala, singer
 Panos Kiamos, singer 
 Giorgos Konitopoulos, musician
 Lambros Konstantaras, actor
 Pavlos Kontogiannidis, actor
 Fotis Kouvelis, former leader of Democratic Left 
 Stamatis Kraounakis, composer
 Stelios Kritikos, actor, storyteller
 Vassilis Logothetidis, actor
 Stelios Mainas, actor
 Pavlos Mamalos, powerlifter, Paralympic Gold medalist
 Giorgos Margaritis, singer
 Yannis Maris, detective fiction writer
 Notis Mavroudis, composer
 Michalis Menidiatis, singer
 Dimitris Melissanidis, businessman
 Fotis Metaxopoulos, dancer, choreographer
 Giorgos Mitsakis, musician
 George Mitsikostas, comedian
 Sotiris Moustakas, actor
 Katerina Moutsatsou, actress
 Dimitris Myrat, actor

 Lina Nikolakopoulou, lyricist
 Nikos Nikolaou, actor
 Christos Nikolopoulos, composer, musician
 Kostas Nikouli, actor
 Aristotle Onasis, one of the world's richest men
 Nikos Orfanos, actor, politician
 Pavlos Orkopoulos, actor
 Spyros Ornerakis, caricaturist
 Tzimis Panousis, musician
 Pantelis Pantelidis, songwriter and singer
 James Pantemis, football player
 Miltos Paschalidis, singer, songwriter
 Errika Prezerakou, pole vaulter
 Alexandros Pantelias, musician
 Giorgos Pantelias, musician
 Makis Papadimitriou, actor
 Antonis Papadopoulos, actor
 Christos Papadopoulos, musician, composer
 Lefteris Papadopoulos, lyricist
 Giannis Papaioannou, musician, composer
 Giannis Papathanasis, actor
 Ange Postecoglou, football manager
 Stathis Psaltis, actor
 Psarantonis, musician
 Stelios Perpiniadis, rebetiko musician
 Miltiadis Papaioannou, politician
 Thanasis Polykandriotis, musician, composer
 Evanthia Reboutsika, musician, composer
 Zozo Sapountzaki, actress, singer
 Nikos Sergianopoulos, actor
 Stan, singer
 Spiros Skouras, film producer
 Pandelis Thalassinos, musician
 Kostas Terzakis, actor, voice actor
 Gianna Terzi, singer
 Marios Tokas, composer
 Sakis Tolis, singer
 Makis Triantafyllopoulos, Greek journalist
 Kostas Tsakonas, actor
 Aris Tsapis, actor
 Paschalis Tsarouchas, actor
 Stefanos Tsitsipas, tennis player
 TUS, rapper
 Giorgos Vasiliou, actor
 Elias Venezis, novelist
 Anna Verouli, javelin thrower
 Pantelis Voulgaris, film director
 Kostas Voutsas, actor
 Despoina Vandi, singer
 Eleni Vitali, singer
 Nikos Xanthopoulos, actor
 Stavros Xenidis, actor
 Nikos Xilouris, singer
 Thomas Zabras, stand-up comedian
 Zannino, actor
 Christoforos Zaralikos, stand-up comedian, actor
 Peggy Zina, singer

AEK Presidential history

Gallery

References

External links

 A.E.K. Sports Club official website

A.E.K. Athens
Multi-sport clubs in Athens